Keshavrao Krishnarao Datey (7 August 1912 – 22 April 1983) was a pioneer of Indian cardiology.  He was a director of the department of cardiology at KEM Hospital, Mumbai.  He was also a founder director of the All India Heart Foundation, and a Fellow of the Royal College of Physicians.

Datey was born in Jabalpur to Krishnaji Hari Datey, an engineer, and Annapurna bai. He did his schooling from Model High School, Jabalpur, and later joined Ewing Christian College at Allahabad. Thereafter, he studied medicine at the Seth G.S.Medical College (1936), then affiliated with University of Bombay. He received his first MRCP from University of Edinburgh in 1947 and MRCP from University of London in 1949.

He was awarded the Padma Bhushan, third highest civilian honour of India by the President of India, in 1969.

References

Indian cardiologists
People from Jabalpur
Marathi people
Recipients of the Padma Bhushan in medicine
Fellows of the Royal College of Physicians
Medical doctors from Mumbai
University of Allahabad alumni
20th-century Indian medical doctors
1912 births
1983 deaths